Anatol is the name given by the Free University of Berlin (the Danish TV2 channel named it "Adam" also often referred to as århundredets orkan (storm of the century) or Decemberorkanen (December Hurricane) in Denmark, and commonly as Carolastormen (Storm Carol) or Orkan Carola (Hurricane Carola) in Sweden to a powerful winter storm that hit Denmark, Southwest Sweden, and Northern Germany on December 3, 1999. The storm had sustained winds of 146 km/h and wind gusts of up to 184 km/h, equivalent to an intense category 1 hurricane, which is unusually strong for storms in northern Europe. The storm caused 20 fatalities, and over 800 injuries in Denmark.

According to the Danish Meteorological Institute, the storm is estimated to have caused damage in Denmark of DKK 15 billion, or about US$3 billion. Storms causing damage of this magnitude are only expected every 500 years in Denmark.

The storm is referred to as a hurricane in Scandinavia and Germany even if it was, in fact, a European windstorm.

See also 
Cyclone Lothar
Cyclone Martin (1999)

Sources 
 Three extreme storms over Europe in December 1999 U. Ulbrich, A. H. Fink, M. Klawa and J. G. Pinto. Institut für Geophysik und Meteorologie der Universität zu Köln.
 Windstorms in Denmark - from DMI (in Danish)

References

Anatol
1999 meteorology
1999 in Denmark
1999 in Sweden
1999 in Germany
Anatol
December 1999 events in Europe
1999 disasters in Europe
1999 disasters in Denmark